The media of Canada is highly autonomous, uncensored, diverse, and very regionalized. Canada has a well-developed media sector, but its cultural output—particularly in English films, television shows, and magazines—is often overshadowed by imports from the United States. As a result, the preservation of a distinctly Canadian culture is supported by federal government programs, laws, and institutions such as the Canadian Broadcasting Corporation (CBC), the National Film Board of Canada (NFB), and the Canadian Radio-television and Telecommunications Commission (CRTC).

Canadian mass media, both print and digital, and in both official languages, is largely dominated by a "handful of corporations". The largest of these corporations is the country's national public broadcaster, the Canadian Broadcasting Corporation, which also plays a significant role in producing domestic cultural content, operating its own radio and TV networks in both English and French. In addition to the CBC, some provincial governments offer their own public educational TV broadcast services as well, such as TVOntario and Télé-Québec.

The 1991 Broadcasting Act declares "the system should serve to safeguard, enrich, and strengthen the cultural, political, social, and economic fabric of Canada". The promotion of multicultural media began in the late 1980s as multicultural policy was legislated in 1988. In the Multiculturalism Act, the federal government proclaimed the recognition of the diversity of Canadian culture.  Thus, multicultural media became an integral part of Canadian media overall. Upon numerous government reports showing lack of minority representation or minority misrepresentation, the Canadian government stressed separate provision be made to allow minorities and ethnicities of Canada to have their own voice in the media.

Non-news media content in Canada, including film and television, is influenced both by local creators as well as by imports from the United States, the United Kingdom, Australia, and France. In an effort to reduce the amount of foreign-made media, government interventions in television broadcasting can include both regulation of content and public financing. Canadian tax laws limit foreign competition in magazine advertising.

History

The history of Canadian media performers goes back to the first days of radio. In the 1940s, the Radio Artists of Toronto Society (RATS) was formed. Radio performers in Montreal, Winnipeg, and Vancouver also organized to fight for artists' rights, working conditions, and better fees. In 1943, the Association of Canadian Radio Artists (ACRA) was formed as a loose national coalition of actors' groups. Over the years, ACRA evolved into the Association of Canadian Radio and Television Artists, followed by the Canadian Council of Authors and Artists, then the Association of Canadian Television and Radio Artists, and, in 1984, to the Alliance of Canadian Cinema, Television and Radio Artists, its present name.

The Canadian Broadcasting Act, historically and in its modern conception, is based on the fact that, since the start of the 20th century, it was important for broadcasters to ensure that information flowed freely and reflected the diversity of Canadian points of view, as opposed to the classic approach, which gives media owners more freedom to express their views. The Canadian broadcasting system as it exists today "would probably not exist if we had allowed the marketplace to regulate ownership rights."

In August 2015, the Canadian Media Guild, the union representing CBC journalists, became a registered third party in order to campaign for increased taxpayer funding of the CBC in the 2015 election. After the Liberal Party of Canada won the election, it increased taxpayer funding of the CBC by CA$150 million. In 2017, the federal government announced a five-year $50-million program to help struggling local newspapers. In 2018, it announced $595 million in tax credits to help struggling newspapers and television networks adapt to competition from online news sources.

In 2013, Maclean's wrote an article noting the influence that Quebecor and owner Pierre Karl Péladeau have on the Quebec media system. The article noted that Quebecor behaves like a counterpart to the federalist La Presse, owned by the Desmarais family. In November 2018, Unifor, the other major union for Canadian journalists, announced that it would campaign against the Conservative Party of Canada in the 43rd Canadian federal election. In February 2019, former Attorney General Jody Wilson-Raybould gave testimony to the House of Commons Justice Committee raising further speculation of political interference from the Liberal Party in journalism. As part of the testimony, Jessica Prince, the Wilson-Raybould's chief of staff revealed that Katie Telford, chief of staff to Prime Minister Justin Trudeau, said: “If Jody is nervous, we would, of course, line up all kinds of people to write op-eds saying that what she is doing is proper.”

Postmedia has faced questions from both Maclean's and Canadaland, regarding whether recent changes to their editorial staff was singling a shift that they were pushing "conservative views" onto their audience. In 2019, Kathy English, the public editor for the Toronto Star, admitted that The Star has failed to meet its journalistic standards by stating "call for reporting fairly and accurately and reflecting the pertinent facts and diversity of views on matters of public debate."

English defended The Star, arguing that there is "no such a thing as objectivity in journalism."

A report released from the Digital Democracy Project, a joint venture between the Public Policy Forum and McGill University’s School of Public Policy revealed that non-partisans with high exposure to traditional media gave roughly 50% more wrong answers than those with low exposure. “Strong partisans,” however, gave almost twice as many.

Regulation
The Canadian government regulates media ownership and the state of media through the Canadian Radio-television and Telecommunications Commission. Section 3(d)(iii) of the Canadian Broadcasting Act states that media organizations should reflect "equal rights, the linguistic duality and multicultural and multiracial nature of Canadian society and the special place of aboriginal peoples within that society."

Television broadcasting

The Canadian television broadcasting industry is split between public and private ownership. Canada currently has 130 originating television stations, which broadcast on 1,456 transmitters across the country, on both the VHF and UHF bands.

In addition to the public Canadian Broadcasting Corporation/Société Radio-Canada, which operates both English (CBC Television) and French (Ici Radio-Canada Télé) television networks, there are five major private TV networks. CTV, Global, and Citytv broadcast in English, and are available throughout the country. TVA and Noovo (formerly 'V') broadcast in French and operate over-the-air in French-language markets (including Quebec and parts of Ontario and New Brunswick), although are also available across Canada via pay television. Most network stations are owned and operated by the networks themselves, although all networks have some affiliates with different ownership.

In addition, the Aboriginal Peoples Television Network (APTN), a service devoted mainly to programming of interest to the Indigenous peoples of Canada, is considered a network by the CRTC, although the network airs terrestrially only in the 3 Canadian territories, and must be carried by all television providers in the rest of Canada. There are, as well, a number of smaller television systems, such as CTV Two (a compliment to the main CTV network in smaller and secondary markets), and Omni Television—a group of Rogers-owned ethnic broadcasters.

Several provinces maintain provincial public broadcasting networks in addition to the CBC, including Télé-Québec, TVOntario, TFO, and Knowledge (British Columbia). Citytv Saskatchewan and CTV Two Alberta were formerly provincial public broadcasters (SCN and Access), but both have since been privatized and amalgamated into commercial networks operated by their current owners (Rogers and Bell). While both outlets devote a portion of their schedules to their networks' respective, advertising-supported entertainment programming, both networks are still required to adhere to an educational remit in the majority of their programming. Unlike in the United States, where a statewide public network is usually the state's primary PBS member station, the provincially owned public systems in Canada are independent of each other and have their own programming.

Only CBC/Radio-Canada, TVA and APTN are officially considered national networks by the CRTC, while V is a provincial network in Quebec. City, CTV and Global are legally considered "television services" even though they operate as networks for all practical purposes. As well, there are a few independent stations, including CFTU in Montreal, CJON in St. John's and CJIL in Lethbridge. However, most of these are not general entertainment stations like independent stations in the United States, but are instead specialty community channels or educational services. CJON is the only independent commercial station currently operating in Canada, although CJON sublicenses a mix of programming from Global, CTV and other sources rather than purchasing program rights independently.

TV station callsigns in Canada are usually made up of four letters, although two stations have three call letters (CKX in Brandon and CKY in Winnipeg) and some (primarily CBC-owned Radio-Canada stations) have five. The first call letter is always C, and callsigns of privately owned television stations start with the two-letter combinations of CF, CH, CI, CJ, or CK. The combinations CG, CY, CZ and several combinations beginning with V and X are also assigned to Canada, but to date no Canadian television station has ever been licensed to take a call sign within those ranges. There is no clear rule for the call letters of rebroadcasters—some are labelled by the call-letters of the originating station, followed by a number, while others have their own distinct call letters. Low-power repeater transmitters (LPRTs) have their own unique callsign format, which consists of the letters CH followed by four numbers. Some rebroadcast transmitters are licensed as semi-satellites, which are licensed to air separate commercials (and, on rarer occasions, a limited amount of distinct programming) targeted to their community of license.

CBC-owned stations use call letters beginning with the combination CB (through a special agreement with the government of Chile); private affiliates of the CBC use the same combinations as other private stations. The CBC has also sometimes directly acquired former private affiliate stations; these usually (although not always) retain their historic call sign rather than changing to a CB call. While Canadian TV stations are technically required to identify themselves over the air by their call letters, the rule is rarely enforced by the CRTC. As a result, most TV stations never use their call letters for any purpose other than official CRTC business, and instead brand under regional names such as CTV Northern Ontario or Global Regina. Even then, most network-owned stations may only use these brands for station identification and newscasts, and promote the majority of their programming under the network brand without any disambiguation.

Due to their proximity to American media markets, a number of Canadian cities and regions receive US broadcasters as part of their local media. This has required special dispensation for Canadian content for broadcasters in the Windsor, Ontario region (due to it falling within the Detroit media footprint), and there have also been cases of US-based broadcasters (KCND-TV of Pembina, North Dakota, now CKND-DT of Winnipeg; also KVOS-TV of Bellingham, Washington) targeting its programming and advertising at Canadian viewers.

Although all broadcast networks in Canada are required to produce and air some Canadian content, only the English and French networks of the CBC run predominantly Canadian-produced schedules, though, the English network does run some imported programming from the United Kingdom, most notably Coronation Street. The private networks, CTV, Global and Citytv, have all at times faced criticism over their level of commitment to producing and airing Canadian programming. The commercial networks often find it easier to purchase rights to hit American series than to invest in Canadian productions, which are often prohibitively costly for the comparatively small size of the Canadian market. The French-language networks traditionally have had less difficulty meeting their Canadian content obligations, as the language difference makes francophone audiences much more readily receptive to home-grown programming than to dubbed American imports.

Digital television is an emerging technology in Canada. Although some TV stations have begun broadcasting digital signals in addition to their regular VHF or UHF broadcasts, this is not yet as widespread as in the United States. Although most markets have digital channel assignments already in place, to date digital broadcasts have only launched in the largest metropolitan areas. Digital television sets are available in Canadian stores, but are not universally present in all Canadian homes.

Several broadcasters, including the CBC, have argued that there is no viable business case for a comprehensive digital conversion strategy in Canada. At CRTC hearings in 2007 on the future direction of regulatory policy for television, broadcasters proposed a number of strategies, including funding digital conversion by eliminating restrictions on the amount of advertising that television broadcasters are permitted to air, allowing terrestrial broadcasters to charge cable viewers a subscription fee similar to that already charged by cable specialty channels, permitting license fees similar to those which fund the BBC in the United Kingdom, or eliminating terrestrial television broadcasting entirely and moving to an exclusively cable-based distribution model.

In May 2007, the CRTC set August 31, 2011 as the deadline for digital conversion in Canada. This is approximately two years later than the cutoff date in the United States. The CRTC ultimately decided to relax restrictions on advertising as the funding mechanism. However, a CRTC statement issued in June 2008 indicated that as of that date, only 22 digital transmitters had been fully installed across the entire country, and expressed the regulator's concern that Canada's television broadcasters were not adequately preparing for the shift to digital broadcasting.

Cable television

Cable television is a very common method of television programming delivery in Canada. Many Canadian cities have cable penetration rates of 90% or more of television households.

There are currently 739 licensed cable distributors in Canada. This significant decline from over 2000 just a few years ago is attributable both to major cable companies acquiring smaller distributors and to a recent change in CRTC rules by which independent cable operators with fewer than 2,000 subscribers are no longer required to operate under full CRTC licences. (However, the CRTC does retain some regulatory authority over these operators. This is an exemption granted by the CRTC to previously licensed companies that continue to meet certain conditions, and does not mean that anybody can simply set up their own small cable company without CRTC approval.)

Major Canadian cable companies include Rogers, Shaw, Cogeco, Vidéotron and EastLink/Persona. Most Canadian cities are served by only one cable company per market; in the few cities that are served by more than one cable company, each company is restricted to a specific geographical division within the market. For instance, in Hamilton, Cogeco Cable, Rogers Cable and Source Cable are all licensed operators, but each has a monopoly in a specific area of the city.

However, two major companies offer direct broadcast satellite delivery as an alternative to cable: Bell Satellite TV, which is a division of BCE Inc., and Shaw Direct, which is a division of Shaw. Grey market DBS dishes can also be obtained from American services such as DirecTV and Dish Network, but as these are not licensed Canadian providers, stores that sell those packages—and users who buy them—are at risk of criminal charges.

In some remote communities in the Territories (Yukon, Northwest Territories, Nunavut), cable delivery is prohibitively costly, so similar services are offered through MMDS technology.

An English-language 'basic cable' package in Canada traditionally includes:

 CTV, CTV Two, Global, City — the major English-language Canadian commercial networks;
 CBC Television and Ici Radio-Canada Télé — the English- and French-language CBC networks;
 a provincial educational broadcast undertaking (e.g. TVO in Ontario), if available (not all provinces have one);
 a community channel, produced by the particular cable company, which usually includes public affairs and information programming as well as community events listings (c.f. public-access television in the United States);
 APTN — a network devoted to Aboriginal programming;
 TVA — one of the two private French-language broadcasters in Quebec;
 nearby independent channels or channels from smaller television systems such as Omni Television or Yes TV;
 CPAC — a channel that broadcasts parliamentary sessions and committee meetings, along with some political public-affairs programming;
 a similar channel to CPAC, but broadcasting the proceedings of the provincial legislature;
 network affiliates (typically from the nearest major American city) of ABC, CBS, Fox, NBC, and PBS;
 a mixture of Canadian and American special-interest channels (e.g. TSN, MuchMusic, CNN, CTV News Channel, Showcase).

A further set of Canadian and American special-interest channels are offered as 'extended cable' packages, which are available for additional fees. In the past, cable companies have engaged in the controversial practice of negative option billing, in which a subscriber is automatically given and billed for the new services unless he or she specifically declines them, but this is now illegal.

A package of 'pay TV' channels is also available for additional fees, including movie networks such as Crave TV, Movie Central, Super Channel, and Super Écran; and American superstations such as WSBK, WPIX, WGN, and KTLA (which are often affiliated with The CW and MyNetworkTV.) These services, however, require a descrambler box.

A study in 2006 said that the CRTC had licensed 44 digital specialty services and 5 ethnic specialty- and pay-television services across the country.

Cable companies now offer digital cable packages in most Canadian cities, including a number of channels which have been licensed exclusively for digital package distribution. Digital cable also typically includes a range of audio broadcast services such as Galaxie and Max Trax. In some markets, digital cable service may also include local radio stations; where this is offered, it has largely replaced the availability of cable FM service. Digital cable, however, is provided only if a customer chooses to subscribe to that package. As of 2016, cable companies are also now required to offer a "skinny basic" option, whereby a small selection of channels typically the main over-the-air networks, along with "public service" channels such as The Weather Network and CPAC are packaged for a maximum fee of $25 with additional channels available on a pick and pay basis at the subscriber's discretion. Although this package has had some popularity, the traditional larger and more expensive cable packages remain the dominant subscription mode.

Although this is sometimes controversial, Canadian cable companies are required by the CRTC to practise simultaneous substitution when a Canadian channel and a non-Canadian channel (which is usually American) are airing the same program at the same time. Programming on an American service may also be blocked if it has significant bearing on a Canadian legal matter (e.g., one episode of Law & Order, inspired by the trials of Paul Bernardo and Karla Homolka, was blocked in Canada) or if it interferes with a Canadian channel's broadcast rights (such as James Bond movies airing on Spike TV; the Canadian broadcast rights are held by Bell Media.)

Many cable companies also offer high speed cable Internet service.

Notes

Radio broadcasting

Canada is served by approximately 2,000 radio stations, on both the AM and FM bands.

As with television stations, radio callsigns in Canada are made up of four letters beginning with the two-letter combinations of CF, CH, CI, CJ, or CK, although a few stations use three-letter callsigns. In addition to private stations CKX and CKY, some CBC stations have three-letter callsigns, generally in major cities where the stations first aired in the 1930s. Newer CBC stations have normal four-letter callsigns, however. As with CBC television, CBC radio uses callsigns beginning with CB, through a special arrangement with the government of Chile. A few exceptions, such as CKSB in Winnipeg and CJBC in Toronto, exist where the CBC acquired an existing station with a historically significant callsign.

The combinations CG, CY, CZ and several combinations beginning with V and X are also assigned to Canada. Only four Canadian radio stations, all in St. John's, Newfoundland and Labrador, have taken call signs in those ranges. Three of these stations, VOAR, VOWR and VOCM, began broadcasting before Newfoundland was a Canadian province, and retained their VO call letters when Newfoundland joined Canadian Confederation in 1949. The other station, VOCM-FM, adopted the callsign in 1981 because of its ownership association with VOCM. With the exception of VOCM-FM, radio stations licensed in Newfoundland after 1949 use the same CF-CK range as other Canadian stations.

The future of VO callsigns in Canada is unknown. It would not be at all unusual for Industry Canada to simplify all callsigns used in Canada as part of the ongoing modernization and simplification of domestic telecom regulations.

There is no clear rule for the call letters of repeater stations—some repeaters are labelled by the call-letters of the originating station, followed by a number, while others have their own distinct call letters. Low-power repeater transmitters (LPRTs) have their own unique callsign format, which consists of the letters VE or VF followed by four numbers.

As of 2020, the four largest major commercial radio broadcast groups in Canada are Stingray Group, Rogers Radio, Corus Radio, and Bell Media Radio. However, many smaller broadcasters operate radio stations as well. Most genres of music are represented on the Canadian commercial radio spectrum, including pop, rock, hip hop, country, jazz and classical. News, sports, talk radio and religious stations are also available in many cities. In addition, many Canadian universities and colleges have licensed campus radio stations, and some communities also have community radio stations or Christian radio stations licensed to non-profit groups or co-operatives. Canada has approximately 14 full-time ethnic radio stations, based primarily in the major metropolitan markets of Toronto, Montreal and Vancouver.

As well, the publicly owned Canadian Broadcasting Corporation operates four national radio networks, two each in English and French. The English Radio One and the French Ici Radio-Canada Première provide news and information programming to most communities in Canada, regardless of size, on either the AM or FM band. The English CBC Music and French Ici Musique provide arts and culture programming, including classical music and opera, and are always on FM, generally serving larger communities only.

Music-based commercial radio stations in Canada are mandated by the Canadian Radio-television and Telecommunications Commission to reserve at least 35 per cent of their playlists for Canadian content, although exemptions are granted in some border cities (e.g. Windsor, Ontario) where the competition from American stations threatens the survival of Canadian broadcasters, and for stations whose formats may not have enough Canadian recordings available to meet the 35 per cent target (e.g. classical, jazz or pop standards).

In recent years, a notable trend in Canadian radio has been the gradual abandonment of the AM band, with many AM stations applying for and receiving authorization from the CRTC to convert to the FM band. In some Canadian cities, in fact, the AM band is now either nearly or entirely vacant. Because Canada is more sparsely populated than the United States, the limitations of AM broadcasting (particularly at night, when the AM dial is often overwhelmed by distant signals) have a much more pronounced effect on Canadian broadcasters. AM radio stations have the additional protection that cable companies which offer cable FM services are required by the CRTC to distribute all locally available AM stations through conversion to a cable FM signal, but cable FM only accounts for a small percentage of radio listeners in Canada.

Digital audio broadcasting, or DAB, is an emerging technology in Canada. Although many radio stations in major metropolitan markets offer digital subchannels with distinct programming from the primary station, not many consumers yet own digital radios and digital broadcasting is usually not available in midsized or small markets. No Canadian radio broadcaster currently operates exclusively in DAB format.

On November 1, 2004, the CRTC began hearing applications for satellite radio services. Three applications were filed: one by XM Radio Canada, one by Sirius Canada, and one by the partnership of CHUM Limited and Astral Media. These services, which were approved by the CRTC on June 16, 2005, were Canada's first official satellite radio services, although a small grey market already existed for American satellite radio receivers. Sirius and XM both launched in December 2005. The CHUM-Astral service, however, was never launched, and its license expired on June 16, 2007; CHUM stated that its business plan was based in part on the expectation that in the interests of Canadian content, the CRTC would have rejected the Sirius and XM applications, approving only the CHUM-Astral service. The two active services, XM and Sirius, merged into Sirius XM Canada in 2011, several months after a similar merger between their American counterparts.

Newspapers

Canada currently has two major national newspapers: The Globe and Mail and National Post. Though not widely read outside Quebec, Le Devoir is the French-language counterpart to the national newspapers. The newspaper with the highest circulation overall is the Toronto Star, while the newspaper with the highest readership per capita is the Windsor Star (with the Calgary Herald running a very close second).

In addition, almost all Canadian cities are served by at least one daily newspaper, along with community and neighbourhood weeklies. In large cities that have more than one daily newspaper, usually at least one daily is a tabloid format; bilingual cities like Montreal and Ottawa have important papers in both French and English.

Canadian newspapers are mostly owned by large chains. At various times there have been concerns about concentration of newspaper ownership, notably in 1970 and 1980 with two commissions, the Davey Committee on combines and the Kent Royal Commission on Newspapers respectively, as well as more recently when Conrad Black's Hollinger acquired Southam Newspapers in the late 1990s. When Hollinger sold its Canadian properties, however, many of their smaller-market newspapers were in fact purchased by a variety of new ownership groups such as Osprey Media, increasing the diversity of newspaper ownership for the first time in many years.

Additionally, the 1980s and 1990s saw the emergence of city-based alternative weekly newspapers, geared toward a younger audience with coverage of the arts and alternative news. In recent years, many of these weeklies have also been acquired or driven out of business by conglomerates like Canwest, Quebecor and Brunswick News. Smaller newspapers like The Dominion, publishing primarily online but in a newspaper format, have attempted to fill gaps in Canada's journalistic coverage while avoiding the vulnerabilities of the previous generation of alternative media.

In the 2000s, a number of online news and culture magazines also launched with the goal of providing alternative sources of journalism. Some important online publications include rabble.ca, The Tyee, The Vancouver Observer, and SooToday.com. Similarly, as of 2006, Canada had over 250 ethnic newspapers.

The late 2010s have seen an expansion in online news partisan outlets with ties to the major political parties in Canada, such as North99 with the Liberal Party, The Post Millennial with the Conservatives, and PressProgress with the NDP have received attention though their massive mostly social-based following.

Motion pictures

Given Canada's small market and its position next to the United States—the dominant producer of feature films—the Canadian film industry receives substantial assistance from the government. In the 2000s, about half of the budget of a typical Canadian film came from various federal and provincial government sources.

Most of Canada's film (and television) industry produces output geared towards mainstream North American audiences, with Entertainment One and Elevation Pictures in particular enjoying significant successes in recent years. Montréal, Toronto and Vancouver are major production centres, with Vancouver being the second largest film and television production centre in North America (after Los Angeles). The Toronto International Film Festival is considered one of the most important events in North American cinema, showcasing both Canadian talent and Hollywood films.

Alliance was by far the largest and most successful Canadian film studio, both as a film and television production house (the company's television properties include Due South, This Hour Has 22 Minutes and C.S.I.), and as the major Canadian distributor of independent American and international films. On January 9, 2013, the company was acquired by Entertainment One.

Canada also produces films of a characteristically "Canadian" nature, and of all Canadian cultural industries, the English-Canadian segment of the film industry has the hardest time escaping the shadow of its (North) American counterpart. Between the marketing budgets of mainstream films, and the largely American-controlled film distribution networks, it has been nearly impossible for most distinctively English-Canadian films to break through to a wide audience. In many Canadian cities, in fact, moviegoers do not even have the option of seeing such films, as there are no theatres screening them. As a result, a Canadian film is usually considered a runaway hit if it makes as little as $1 million at the box office.

French-Canadian films, on the other hand, are often more successful—as with French-language television, the language difference makes Quebec audiences much more receptive to Canadian-produced film. In many years, the top-grossing Canadian film is a French-language production from Quebec.

As a result of the economic challenges involved in Canadian film production, film funding is often provided by government bodies such as Telefilm Canada, and television services such as CBC Television, Crave or Super Channel are often a Canadian film's most lucrative potential market. However, there is an established network of film festivals which also provide important marketing and audience opportunities for Canadian films. In addition to the Toronto International Film Festival, the smaller Vancouver International Film Festival features films from around the world, and other major festivals in Montréal, Calgary, Edmonton and Greater Sudbury—among other cities—are also important opportunities for Canadian filmmakers to gain exposure among more populist film audiences.

One particular film production house, the National Film Board of Canada, has become internationally famous for its animation and documentary production.

Publishing

Books
Canada is home to a robust book publishing industry that operates in both official languages.

English Language Publishers In Canada

 McClelland and Stewart
 which made its name in the 1970s as the leading publisher of English language Canadian literature. English Canada also has many smaller publishing houses, including Coach House Press, the Porcupine's Quill, House of Anansi, Key Porter Books, Hidden Brook Press, and Douglas & McIntyr
Foreign Publishers With Branches In Canada

 Coach House Press, 
 the Porcupine's Quill, House of Anansi, Key Porter Books, 
 Hidden Brook Press 
 Douglas & McIntyr

Major francophone publishers in Quebec include Bibliothèque québécoise, Alire, Québec-Amérique, Éditions Guérin and Groupe Beauchemin. Several small francophone publishers also operate outside of Quebec, including Éditions Le Nordir and Prise de parole.

Canada's largest English science fiction genre publisher is EDGE Science Fiction and Fantasy Publishing, which now also owns the Tesseract Books imprint, well known for producing excellent Canadian speculative fiction.

Magazines

A notable controversy in Canadian magazine publishing in recent years has been the existence of split run magazines, where a title published in another country, such as TIME or Sports Illustrated, is republished in Canada with a few pages of special Canadian content, in order to take advantage of Canadian advertising sales revenues. The government of Canada imposed a special excise tax on split run publications in 1995 to discourage the practice, although this continues to be controversial.

Magazines published in Canada include:

 L'Actualité
 AdBusters
 Auto Atlantic East Coast auto magazine
 Canadian Business
 Canadian Dimension
 Canadian Geographic
 Canadian Living
 Chart
 Chatelaine women's magazine
 chickaDEE
Cult MTL
 Enterprise Mag
 Exclaim!
 Flare fashion
 Frank satirical
 Geist
 Literary Review of Canada
 Maclean's
 Maisonneuve
 MoneySense
 My Halifax EXperience
 OWL
 Saturday Night
 Today's Parent
 Sharp (magazine)
 Toronto Life
 This Magazine
 UMM
 Up Here
 The Walrus

Digital

The rise of online media platforms has inevitably disrupted the need for print media consumption. The concern, however, lies in whether or not these online platforms, whether hyperlocal or national, have appropriate practices to enforce standard journalism practices in place, avoiding situations of 'fake news'. For example, some platforms have been known to use scare-tactics to drive web traffic.

Online-only media publishers in Canada include:

 BlogTO
Better Dwelling
'The Breach'
Canoe
 Daily Hive
 Freshdaily
 Investigative Journalism Foundation
The Line
The Logic
 MTL blog
Narcity
Newsrooms
Rabble.ca
Spotlight Magazine
 The Title Report
 The Tyee
 Torontoist
Trnto
University Magazine
Vice Magazine
The Weekly
 Yahoo Canada
STAMINA Group
DIVINE.ca
View the VIBE 
 Swagger Magazine
 WanderEater Magazine

See also

Media ownership in Canada
Concentration of media ownership in Canada
Multicultural media in Canada
Canadian Communications Foundation
List of radio stations in Ontario
Western media

References

Further reading

External links
 Television: Channel Canada, Canadian Cable and Satellite Database.
 Film: The Great Canadian Guide to Movies and TV.
 Magazines: Finding Canadian Magazines Journalism.Net.
 Newspaper: The Canadian Newspaper Association,ThePaperboy.com Canadian Newspapers.
 CBC Digital Archives Concentration to Convergence: Media Ownership in Canada
 Canadian Radio-Television and Telecommunications Commission (CRTC)
 broadcasting-history.ca Canadian Communications Foundation
 Canadian Media History sources: Media History in Canada bibliographic database
 Telecommunications, internet and overall media landscape: {http://cmcrp.org] Canadian Media Concentration Research Project
Canadian Radio Directory The complete accurate user-friendly list of Canadian radio stations.

Mass media in Canada